Kellie Denise Bright (born 1 July 1976) is an English actress. Her roles include Linda Carter in the BBC soap opera EastEnders, for which she won the 2015 British Soap Award for Best Actress and Best Dramatic Performance, Julie in Ali G Indahouse, Joanna Burrows in The Upper Hand (1990–1996), Cassie Tyler in Bad Girls (2002) and Joan Trotter in Rock & Chips (2010–2011). In 2015, she was the runner-up in the 13th series of the BBC One show Strictly Come Dancing.

Career

Early career
Bright has been acting since she was 11, appearing on stage in shows such as Annie and Les Misérables, before landing a place at the Sylvia Young Theatre School where she became friends with Emma Bunton and Keeley Hawes. As a child actress, she appeared in several different series' on British television in the late 1980s and the 1990s, including T-Bag and Maid Marian and Her Merry Men. In 1990, at the age of 13, Bright was cast as Joanna Burrows in TV series The Upper Hand alongside William Puttock, Joe McGann, Diana Weston and Honor Blackman which ran for six years.

After The Upper Hand had finished, Bright has said that she struggled to make ends meet. She says, "I didn't have any acting work, so I got a job waiting on tables to pay the mortgage, but it was while The Upper Hand was still on air. Next thing I know, a customer had called a newspaper saying I was there and some photographers appeared out of the blue snapping away." She also worked as a receptionist at a nightclub in London. She continued, "I was getting rejected from one job after another and no matter how much I tried not to take it personally, a part of me couldn't help but think: 'I was too ugly to get that part'." Bright played Kate Madikane (née Aldridge) in Radio 4's The Archers, and was with the series from 1995 until 2004.

Mainstream success
Bright has also had main roles in Bad Girls and has also guest starred in Da Ali G Show and made an appearance in the film Ali G Indahouse. Bright has made several guest appearances on British television programmes, her credits include Holby City, Casualty, The Catherine Tate Show and Vera.

Bright appeared as Joan Trotter in the Only Fools and Horses prequel, Rock and Chips, from 2010 until 2011.

EastEnders

In October 2013, Bright was cast as Linda Carter in the BBC soap opera EastEnders. Linda made her first on screen appearance on 19 December 2013, but officially arrived on Albert Square with her husband, Mick (played by Danny Dyer) and her children on 26 December 2013. The Carter family were created by the show's executive producer Dominic Treadwell-Collins who planned to completely revamp the show. Since her arrival, Bright's character Linda has been a part of some of the show's biggest storylines such as struggling to accept that her son Johnny (Sam Strike) is gay. In October 2014, Linda was involved in a controversial storyline where she was raped by Dean Wicks (Matt Di Angelo). On filming this particular storyline, Bright stated that "It is a challenging storyline, but it is an important storyline and I feel honoured to have been given it".
Bright was praised for her performance during this storyline. Bright won the 2014 Digital Spy's Readers Award for Best Female Soap Actress. Along with Dyer, Bright was nominated for "Best On-screen Partnership" at The British Soap Awards 2014 for the relationship between Mick and Linda. In 2015, she was nominated for the "Serial Drama Performance" award at the National Television Awards, however the award was won by Dyer. She has been nominated for Best Actress and Best Dramatic Performance at The British Soap Awards 2015; Bright won both. On 12 March 2015, Bright revealed that she had received "personal letters" from rape victims who had been affected by Linda's story, leaving her feeling "humbled" by the audience's response.

Other ventures
In 1992, Bright voiced the character of Beauty in the Bevanfield Films production of Beauty and the Beast. She has also voiced several video game characters, including the Hero of Brightwall in the game Fable III in 2010. In 2011, Bright did voicework for Nintendo and Monolith Soft's Xenoblade Chronicles as the medic Sharla.

Bright took part in the BBC's Children in Need appeal in 2014 along with Danny Dyer and the rest of the EastEnders cast who performed a Grease medley titled "Grease Enders". Bright appears as Linda though dressed up as Sandy Olsen.  She performed in "You're the One That I Want" and "We Go Together".

In September 2015, Bright joined the thirteenth series of Strictly Come Dancing on BBC One. Bright chose to continue playing Linda Carter on EastEnders while competing on Strictly Come Dancing, working all day at EastEnders and rehearsing for Strictly in the evening. Paired with professional dancer Kevin Clifton, she was described by head judge Len Goodman as a "great all round dancer". On 19 December the pair reached the final three and topped the leaderboard with a score of 119. Their score including two maximum scores of 40 for their tango to "You Really Got Me" by The Kinks and their showdance to "The Ding-Dong Daddy of the D-Car Line" by Cherry Poppin' Daddies. Their final dance, a Charleston to "Cantina Band" from Star Wars, scored 39, but the public voted Jay McGuiness and Aliona Vilani as the competition winners.

Personal life
Bright married her long-term partner, Paul Stocker, at Trelill, Cornwall on 5 July 2014. In December 2011, she gave birth to her first son. She gave birth to her second son on 21 November 2016. Her second son was conceived through IVF, and following his birth, the couple froze three embryos. After two failed attempts at conceiving in 2020, Bright announced in March 2021 that she was pregnant with the couple's third son, who was born on 22 July.

Filmography

Film

Television

Radio

Video games

Web

Theatre credits

Awards and nominations

References

External links

 

1976 births
Living people
Alumni of the Sylvia Young Theatre School
English child actresses
English television actresses
English radio actresses
English soap opera actresses
English video game actresses
People from Brentwood, Essex
Actresses from Essex
20th-century English actresses
21st-century English actresses